Twice Is Not Enough is the eleventh studio album by power electronics band Whitehouse, released in 1991 through Susan Lawly. The album cover, depicting a dog sitting on a bed, was drawn by Trevor Brown, and references multiple different murders performed by serial killers. In 1999, the album was reissued as a special edition CD with bonus tracks, all of which originated from the band's 1992 album Never Forget Death, which was out-of-print by that point in time.

Track listing

Personnel
William Bennett - vocals, synthesizers, production
Peter Sotos - lyrics
Dave Kenny - production
Steve Albini - production (on "Neronia")
Scorpio - production (on "Fanatics")
Alan Gifford - graphic design
Denis Blackham - mastering
Trevor Brown - artwork

References

External links
 

1991 albums
Whitehouse (band) albums
Albums produced by Steve Albini